Heydari may refer to:

Places in Iran
 Heydari, Bushehr, Bushehr Province
 Heydari, Tangestan, Bushehr Province
 Heydari, Chaharmahal and Bakhtiari
 Heydari, Fars
 Heydari, Hormozgan

Other uses
 Heydari (name), an Iranian surname

See also
 Heydar, an Iranian male given name